Balaran or Balara is a village in the Laxmangarh administrative region of the Sikar district of Rajasthan state in India. It borders other villages and towns including; Bhairunpura, Sankhu, Mirzwas, Kheri Radan, Rajpura, Churi Miyan Swami Ki Dhani and Madopura.
The nearby railway stations are Mukundgarh, Dundlod, Laxmangarh, and Sikar.

Village government

Balaran is a Panchayat. The title of leader is Sarpanch. Balaran village falls under Laxmangarh assembly & Sikar parliamentary constituency.

Village economy
About 80% of the population are farmers. Village agriculture is dependent on the monsoon rains, although today many farms use artesian wells for irrigation.

Climate

Balaran has a hot summer, sparse rainfall, a chilly winter season, and general dryness of the air except in the brief monsoon season. The average maximum and minimum temperatures are 28 to 30 and 15 to 16 degrees Celsius respectively.

Transportation
Balaran is connected by a two-lane asphalt road to Laxmangarh, Mukandgarh and Nawalgarh. Nawalgarh Railway station is from Balaran and is well connected from Jaipur, Delhi and other cities. Asphalt roads connect the village to surrounding villages and to Laxmangarh.

Camel carts and bullock carts were formerly the chief means of transportation, now replaced by bicycles and other automobiles. Quite a few villagers walk to Nawalgarh and other surrounding places. In the rainy season, womenfolk carry grass on their heads for cows and buffaloes.

Education

The villagers claim to be fully literate and all children attend school. However, many women remain illiterate, even though literacy rates are improving. Many students of the village have obtained admission to pioneering engineering institutes as well as into medical colleges through various competitions run by the Indian Institutes of Technology (IIT), All India Engineering Entrance Examination  (AIEEE), etc. Besides these, other careers such as teaching, nursing, and defense forces are also popular. The village has both private and government schools. The government schools are up to intermediate class. The village also has a government intermediate school for girls with the subject of arts.

Religion

The majority of the citizenry practice Hinduism and Islam.

Society and culture

Village society is governed solely by Hindu rituals, although the younger generations are influenced by Western culture .

Music and entertainment

Folk songs are sung by women during weddings and on other social occasions; menfolk sing dhamaal ( traditional Holi songs). Many villagers own TVs as well as radios and satellite dishes. The sound of popular Hindi music emanating from stereos and other devices is heard from different houses during the afternoon and evening.

Games and sports

Most of the children play cricket. Some villagers also play volleyball and football. Villagers can be seen playing cards in chaupal (common area in the village).

Festivals

Villagers celebrate all major Hindu festivals. Some of the major festivals are Holi, Eid, Bakrid, Moharram, Deepawali, Makar Sankranti, Raksha Bandhan, Sawan, Teej, Gauga Peer, and Gangaur.

Location

Balaran is located 13 km away from Laxmangarh tehsil towards east side.

Religious places

 RaghuNath Ji Ka Bada Mandir
Jama Masjid
 Shiv Mandir
 Rani Sati Dadi Mandir
 Karant Ka Balaji mandir
 Kothi Ka Balaji Mandir
 Raghunath Ji Ka Mandir
 Baba Gorakhnath Ji Mandir
 Nurani Masjid
 Ghantaghar
 Johda
 Hanuman Ji Mandir, Swami Ki Dhani

References

External links
 List of Sarpanch elected in 2010
 List of villages and Panchayat Samiti in Rajasthan
 Official website of Sikar District
 
 

Villages in Sikar district